The Dutch steam trawler Voorbode was a fishing vessel, until it was confiscated by the Germans during World War II and used for military transport. In April 1944, it was on its way from Oslo to Kirkenes when it had mechanical problems, forcing it to seek repairs in Bergen, Norway.

Resulting damage
On April 20 at 8:39, the ship exploded at the quay in the center of Bergen. The force of the explosion caused a water column that was hundreds of metres high, spreading heavy debris. The air pressure from the explosion and the tsunami that followed flattened whole neighbourhoods near the harbour; then fires broke out and further destroyed the wooden houses, leaving 5,000 people homeless; 160 people were killed and 5,000 wounded, mostly civilians. The Nykirken was among the buildings which were severely damaged.

Reporting
The Germans initially tried to conceal the extent of the catastrophe, probably because it exposed their failure to maintain security regulations. Because the explosion occurred on Adolf Hitler's birthday, there was some suspicion of sabotage, but investigations revealed that the explosion was an accident caused by self-ignition. Rescue efforts after the event were extensive and have been well documented.

References

External links
 
 
 

20th century in Bergen
Ships of the Netherlands
World War II auxiliary ships of Germany
World War II shipwrecks in the North Sea
Maritime incidents in April 1944
1944 in Norway